Surf Coast Football Club is an Australian semi-professional association football (soccer) club based in the Victorian seaside town of Torquay. Founded in 2001, the club gained entry into the competitive state system in 2008 and currently competes in the western conference of Victorian State League Division 4 as of 2022.

Notable players:

Thomas Dunn (GK) Melbourne Heart 2011/12

Honours
Provisional League Division Two North-West/Victorian State League Division 4 West (sixth tier)
Runners-up (1): 2010 (promoted)
Third place (1): 2016
Provisional League Division Three North-West (seventh tier)
Runners-up (1): 2009 (promoted)

See also	
Geelong Regional Football Association

References

External links
 Surfcoast FC Official Website

Soccer clubs in Victoria (Australia)
2001 establishments in Australia
Surf Coast Shire
Victorian State League teams
Association football clubs established in 2001